Eudonia lineola is a species of moth in the family Crambidae. It is found in Great Britain, Ireland, the Netherlands, France, Spain, Portugal and on Sardinia, the Canary Islands, as well as in North Africa, including Morocco.

The wingspan is 21–38 mm. Adults have contrasting black and white markings, sprinkled with a greenish-brown tone. They are on wing from July to August in one generation per year.

The larvae feed on lichens, including Parmelia species.

Subspecies
Eudonia lineola lineola
Eudonia lineola tafirella Chrétien, 1908 (Canary Islands)

References

Eudonia
Moths described in 1827
Moths of Africa
Moths of Europe
Insects of Turkey